Coleophora harbinensis is a moth of the family Coleophoridae. It is found in China.

References

harbinensis
Moths of Asia